The Dr. Ambedkar Nagar railway station is one of the local railway stations in Dr. Ambedkar Nagar, a suburb of Indore.

History 

This station on the Delhi–Hyderabad metre-gauge line was founded in the 1870s. The station is equipped with two reservation counters.

Development 
Mhow has been connected to Indore and Khandwa by metre-gauge railway lines. In 2008, the Union Cabinet approved the gauge conversion for the Ratlam–Mhow-Khandwa–Akola railway line. (472.64 km). The cost of the gauge conversion would be about Rs.1421.25 crore. In January 2017, the station was named after B. R. Ambedkar.

See also
 Akola–Ratlam line

References

External links 

`Project Unigauge' likely to be included in the 11th plan

Pakala-Dharmavaram BG line opened

Transport in Mhow
Railway stations in Indore district
Ratlam railway division
Railway stations in Indore
1870s establishments in India
Railway stations opened in the 1870s